Placothuria is a genus of sea cucumbers belonging to the monotypic family Placothuriidae.

The species of this genus are found in Australia and New Zealand.

Species:

Placothuria huttoni 
Placothuria molpadioides 
Placothuria squamata

References

Dendrochirotida